Ramgarh is a town and a notified area committee, near Samba town in Samba District in the Indian union territory of Jammu and Kashmir.

Demographics
 India census, Ramgarh had a population of 4,540. Males constitute 52% of the population and females 48%. Ramgarh has an average literacy rate of 67%, higher than the national average of 59.5%: male literacy is 75%, and female literacy is 59%. 14% of the population of Ramgarh is under 6 years of age.

Gallery

References

Cities and towns in Jammu district